The 1ª Divisão de Andebol Feminino, Andebol 1 Feminino or Campeonato Nacional Seniores Femininos, 1ª Divisão, is the premier women's handball league in Portugal. It was established in 1978, and it is currently contested by twelve teams. Madeira SAD is the championship's most decorated team.

List of champions

Women's Portuguese First Division
 1977–78 | Oeiras | 1
 1978–79 | Oeiras | 2
 1979–80 | Maria Amália | 1
 1980–81 | Torres Novas | 1
 1981–82 | Almada | 1
 1982–83 | Oeiras | 3
 1983–84 | Benfica | 1
 1984–85 | Ginásio Clube do Sul | 1
 1985–86 | Benfica | 2
 1986–87 | Benfica | 3
 1987–88 | Ginásio Clube do Sul | 2
 1988–89 | Benfica | 4
 1989–90 | Benfica | 5
 1990–91 | Colégio de Gaia | 1
 1991–92 | Benfica | 6
 1992–93 | Benfica | 7
 1993–94 | CS Madeira | 1
 1994–95 | CS Madeira | 2
 1995–96 | CS Madeira | 3
 1996–97 | CS Madeira | 4
 1997–98 | AC Funchal | 1
 1998–99 | Madeira SAD | 1
 1999–20 | Madeira SAD | 2
 2000–01 | Madeira SAD | 3
 2001–02 | Madeira SAD | 4
 2002–03 | Madeira SAD | 5
 2003–04 | Madeira SAD | 6
 2004–05 | Madeira SAD | 7
 2005–06 | Madeira SAD | 8
 2006–07 | Madeira SAD | 9
 2007–08 | Madeira SAD | 10
 2008–09 | Madeira SAD | 11

Andebol 1 Feminino

Performances

See also 

Men's

 Andebol 1 
 Second Division 
 Third Division
 Taça de Portugal 
 Supertaça
  Youth Honors

Women's
 Taça de Portugal
 Supertaça
  Youth Honors (Women)

Notes

References

Portigal
Women
Sports leagues established in 1978
1978 establishments in Portugal
Women's handball in Portugal
Women's sports leagues in Portugal
Professional sports leagues in Portugal